Marudanallur is a village in the Kumbakonam taluk of Thanjavur district, Tamil Nadu, India.

Demographics 

As per the 2001 census, Marudanallur had a total population of 2605 with 1333 males and 1272 females. The sex ratio was 954. The literacy rate was 78.07

References 

 

Villages in Thanjavur district